Channel Island English refers to Alderney English, Guernsey English and Jersey English and similar dialects of English found in the other Channel Islands.

Variations

Alderney English

Alderney English is the variety of English spoken by some residents of Alderney. It is questionable whether this is a separate dialect: due to Alderney's small size and high rate of immigration and emigration, particularly to/from nearby Guernsey and the UK, a high proportion of the population speaks the English of their place of origin, while many people who have been educated in Guernsey in their youth have acquired a way of speaking that is close to Guernsey English.

Thus Alderney English currently corresponds quite closely to standard English, with a tendency towards mild archaism due to the population demographic in which the over-50s are the largest group.

Its distinguishing feature is a small but significant number of loan words from Guernésiais (the variety of Norman spoken on the neighbouring island of Guernsey), Legal French (which was the language of legislation before the Second World War) and a very much smaller number of words that have come down from Auregnais (now a dead language, it is no longer certain whether there are any rememberers still alive).

An examples of a word used in Alderney that appears neither in standard English nor in Guernsey English is "Impôt" (meaning 'rubbish tip/recycling centre' and not 'tax/imposition' as elsewhere). Any remainder of the historic influence of Auregnais on Alderney English is very hard to discern, since Guernésiais and Auregnais differed only slightly.

Guernsey English

Guernsey English is the dialect of English spoken in Guernsey, distinguished by having considerable influence from Guernésiais, the variety of Norman indigenous to Guernsey.

The dialect contains terms such as buncho (from Dgèrnésiais: bond d'tchu) for the English "somersault"; "it picks" instead of "it stings", from the Guernsey equivalent of the French "ça pique"; "chirry" for "goodbye"; and "Budlo Night" instead of Bonfire Night on 5 November.

Often Guernsey people will add the word "Eh" to the end of a sentence, inferring a general agreement that something is held to be true or correct. It can also be used in the context of asking a question or seeking reassurance that what was said is correct if it is believed to be a contentious issue.

Jersey English

Jersey English is a dialect of English spoken in Jersey, Channel Islands, the accent of which has been likened to that of South African English. It is influenced by the use of Jèrriais and Jersey Legal French.

Influence of Jersey Legal French on Jersey English

Jersey English has imported a number of Jersey Legal French titles and terminology. Many of these, in turn, derive from Jèrriais.  The following are examples likely to be encountered in daily life and in news reports in Jersey:

Pronunciation

Vowels

Consonants

H-drops and intrusive H leading to sentences like: “My mother was very hill and I was the heldest, and I stayed to 'elp my mother.”
R tends to be uvular in the island of Sark, and trilled throughout the archipelago.
Medial yod often appears after an initial voiced consonant such as 
Interference from the Norman Languages caused their intonation and word stress to be different sometimes, like edu'cated, Liver'pool and rail'way.

Morphosyntax

The Norman Influence is more clearly demonstrable in Channel Island English morphosyntax than in its phonology.
Examples of structures used by people in the Channel Islands are:

“There's ten years I am a farmer” for “I've been a farmer for ten years.”
“Me, I don't want to go” or “I don't want to go, me.”
“That's the one, eh?” Eh for “isn't it?”, “aren't they?”, “don't you think?”, or else.
“There's two castles there” for “There are two castles there.”
“... and the teacher, she was angry, eh.” (use of emphatic personal pronoun.)

See also
 Ebenezer Le Page

References

Further reading

External links
 Guernesiais today

Dialects of English
Guernsey culture
Jersey culture
Languages of the Channel Islands